Anthiyalam is a small village located 6.5 km away from Palai in Kottayam district of Kerala state, India.This place can be reached by travelling Pala-Ramapuram route via Ezhachery or from Payappar junction in Pala-Thodupuzha route (approx:2.6 Km) or from Kollapally in Pala-Thodupuzha route. One branch of The Valavoor Service co-operative bank is located here.Govt. Primary health centre is also located here. Rubber is the main produce in this area along with coconut, banana, plantain, and tapioca.

Location
Anthilayam is between Palai and Ramapuram and has a famous church known as Anthiyalam Pally or St. Mathew's Church.

Schools
There is also a small LP School close to the village called St. Mathew's School. There is also a close town named Ezhachery.

References

Villages in Kottayam district